Naḥman ben Simḥah Berlin was a Jewish polemical writer from Lissa, Germany. His literary activity was wholly devoted to the cause of orthodoxy, opposing steadfastly and systematically all attempts at the reform of Judaism.

Bibliography
  Directed against the editors of the Hebrew periodical Ha-Meassef, and especially against Aaron Wolfssohn.
  An introduction to the Ḥavot Da'at of Jacob ben Moses of Lissa.
  Against the innovators.
  Against several works by different reform writers.
  On the traditions of oral law, as well as on the necessity of having the prayers in Hebrew.
  A call to unity in religious affairs.

References
 

18th-century German Jews
19th-century German Jews
Jewish German writers
German Orthodox Jews
People from Leszno